Staalplaat is an independent record label that is located in Amsterdam with a separate store in Berlin. Founded in 1982, the company's mission was to create a sound forum for sound artists, who write and perform new and experimental music.

Staalplaat artists

See also
 List of record labels
 List of independent record labels

References

External links
 Staalplaat.com - official website

Dutch independent record labels
Record labels established in 1982
Experimental music record labels
Industrial record labels
Electronic dance music record labels
1982 establishments in the Netherlands